The Dominican University College (DUC) is a bilingual university located in Ottawa, Ontario, Canada.  Since 2012, Dominican University College has been an affiliated college of Carleton University.

Founded in 1900 and granted a civil university charter in 1967, Dominican University College is modelled on the houses of studies of the Order of Preachers and was originally the centre of graduate studies for Canadian Dominicans. Today, Dominican offers civil and pontifical bachelor's, master's, and doctoral degrees in philosophy and theology.

History
The Saint-Jean-Baptiste church was completed in November 1872 at the corner of Primrose and Victoria Avenue (now Empress) in Ottawa. The adjoining Dominican convent and house of studies opened in 1899, modelled after the medieval studium generale specializing in Philosophy and Theology. In 1900, the Dominicans brought their School of Theology to Ottawa, followed shortly thereafter by studies in Philosophy in 1902, and granted ecclesiastical degrees at the level of licentiate. The first regent of the university, from 1900 to 1920, was Raymond-Marie Rouleau, who would later become Archbishop of Quebec and then a Cardinal.

In 1930, the Institut d'Etudes Medievales d'Ottawa was established at the convent as the French-speaking equivalent to the Institute of Mediaeval Studies at St. Michael's College of the University of Toronto, founded in 1929. Étienne Gilson and Marie-Dominique Chenu were instrumental in the founding of the institute, which relocated to the Université de Montréal in 1942.

On February 8, 1931, a fire destroyed the original Saint-Jean-Baptiste church and portions of the convent. The rebuilt church and convent which remain today were opened on Easter 1932.

In 1967, a civil charter was granted to the Collège dominicain de philosophie et de théologie by the Ontario Government, allowing the college to offer civil university degrees in philosophy and theology. The first Doctorate in Theology from Dominican College was granted in 1971. In 1974, Dominican College joined the Association of Universities and Colleges of Canada. The university opened its undergraduate and graduate programs in Philosophy to English-speaking students in 1992 and 1997, respectively, and established English undergraduate and graduate programs in Theology in 2003 and 2007.

Today the building houses the Dominican Monastery and the Dominican University College, which offers undergraduate and graduate studies in philosophy and theology. The building has several architecturally interesting and historically significant features, including cloister vault ceilings, stained glass by Guido Nincheri, and a Casavant Frères organ.

Research
The Faculty of Philosophy at DUC specializes in the history of philosophy, modern European philosophy, and Aristotelian-Thomistic metaphysics. Faculty members come from both the analytic and continental traditions.

The Faculty of Theology has strengths in New Testament hermeneutics and value personalism.

Science et Esprit
Since 1998, DUC has been the home of the journal Science et Esprit. First established in 1948 under the name Sciences Ecclésiastiques by professors in the Faculty of the Society of Jesus in Montreal, the journal specializes in philosophy and theology, and publishes articles in both English and French.

Student Association
The Association Étudiants Collège Dominicain (AECDO) elects representatives to sit on the boards for both the Faculty of Philosophy and of the Faculty of Theology. It organizes and directs various activities (extracurricular, social justice committee, social gathering) pertaining to student life.

Academics

Faculty of Philosophy
Undergraduate Programs

Bachelor of Philosophy (Honours)
Bachelor of Philosophy (Honours) with minor in Ethics
Bachelor of Arts (Honours) with major in Philosophy and minor in Theology
Bachelor of Arts with a concentration in Philosophy
Bachelor of Arts in Philosophy with minor in Ethics

Graduate Programs
Master of Arts in Philosophy
Doctorate in Philosophy

Faculty of Theology
Undergraduate Programs

Bachelor in Theology
Bachelor of Arts with major in Theology and minor in Philosophy

Graduate Programs

Master of Arts in Theology and Licenciate
Master of Theology
Doctorate in Theology (Ph.D. / Canonical Degree)

Partnerships

Institut de pastorale des Dominicains
In 1967, DUC partnered with the Institut de pastorale des Dominicains in Montreal. The institute was founded in 1960 by the Dominican Order during the construction of the convent of Saint Albert the Great, and offers French programs in pastoral or liturgical theology or in catechism, leading to university certificates, bachelor's and master's degrees.

Carleton University
Since 2012 DUC has been affiliated with Carleton University. Students at Dominican are entered into Carleton's student enrollment system, have access to its library, and – apart from those pursuing professional, ecclesiastical studies – receive their diplomas jointly from both institutions. Carleton students can take electives at Dominican and vice versa. Their affiliation agreement was renewed in 2018.

Students of DUC are also permitted to take courses within the Faculty of Arts at the University of Ottawa.

DUC is a member of the Association of Universities and Colleges of Canada and of L'Association des collèges et universités de la francophonie canadienne, a network of academic institutions of the Canadian Francophonie.

Dominican University College Foundation
The Dominican University College Foundation is a public charitable organization whose sole purpose is to raise funds for DUC and the Institut de pastorale in order to help build its future and support students and faculty through bursaries and endowed research chairs.

Notable people and alumni
Leslie Armour - former professor of philosophy, known for his work on Canadian philosophy and economics. 
Lawrence Dewan - former professor of philosophy, known for his work in Thomistic studies.
Lorraine Caza - alumna and former professor, the first woman in the world to hold the position of Dean of a faculty of theology of pontifical right.
Benoît Lacroix - philosopher, theologian, and medievalist.

See also

 Canadian government scientific research organizations
 Canadian industrial research and development organizations
 Canadian Interuniversity Sport
 Canadian university scientific research organizations
 Higher education in Ontario
 List of colleges and universities named after people
 List of Ontario Universities
 Ontario Student Assistance Program

References

External links 

 
 Institut de pastorale website
 Canadian Dominicans
 University's Online Library Catalog

Universities and colleges in Ottawa
Universities in Ontario
Catholic universities and colleges in Canada
French-language universities and colleges in Ontario
Carleton University
1900 establishments in Ontario
Educational institutions established in 1900